Subash Sarbadhikari was a former Indian association football player. He was part of the team that played at the 1952 Summer Olympics, but he did not play in any matches. He was part of the Mohun Bagan team that won the Durand Cup in 1953.

Honours

Mohun Bagan
Durand Cup: 1953

References

External links
 

India international footballers
Olympic footballers of India
Mohun Bagan AC players
Footballers from West Bengal
Footballers at the 1952 Summer Olympics
Possibly living people
Year of birth missing
Indian footballers
Association football midfielders
Calcutta Football League players